The Tocantins Pimelodus, (Aguarunichthys tocantinsensis), is a species of benthopelagic catfish of the family Pimelodidae that is native to Brazil.

It grows to a length of 31.7 cm. It inhabits fresh waters with strong currents and rocky bottom of Tucurui dam, in the Tocantins River.

Head longer than wide and weakly depressed. Eyes large. Snout broad. Anterior nostril closer to snout. Posterior nostril, anteriorly surrounded by dermal flap. Mouth distinctly subterminal. Head, body and fins are brownish green with black spots. Barbels blackish. Small blotches around anal fin base.

References

Pimelodidae
Catfish of South America
Freshwater fish of Brazil
Taxa named by Jansen Alfredo Sampaio Zuanon 
Taxa named by Lúcia Helena Rapp Py-Daniel
Taxa named by Michel Louis Arthur Marie Ange François Jégu
Fish described in 1993